En bloc means "all together". It may refer to:

 En Bloc, a Singaporean television drama 
 A type of ammunition loading in firearms